Richard Tetteh Seglah is a Ghanaian politician and member of the first parliament of the second republic of Ghana representing Anlo constituency in the Volta Region of Ghana under the membership of the National Alliance Liberals.

Early life and education 
Seglah was born in June 1932. He attended Zion College, Wesley College and University of Ghana. where he obtained a Teachers' Training Certificate, Bachelor of Arts and Bachelor of Laws respectively in Law and later worked as a barrister and solicitor before going into Parliament.

Career and politics 
Seglah begun his career as a barrister and solicitor. His political career begun in 1969 when he became the parliamentary candidate to represent his constituency Anlo in the Volta Region of Ghana prior to the commencement of the 1969 Ghanaian parliamentary election.

He was sworn into the First Parliament of the Second Republic of Ghana on 1 October 1969, after being pronounced winner at the 1969 Ghanaian election held on 26 August 1969. and his tenure of office ended on 13 January 1972.

Personal life 
Seglah is Presbyterian.

References 

1932 births
Living people
National Alliance of Liberals politicians
Ghanaian MPs 1969–1972
Ghanaian Christians
People from Volta Region
University of Ghana alumni